Jeff Cashen is an Australian adult-contemporary/acoustic singer-songwriter, he released and toured his debut album ‘Threads’ in 2007. His influences are diverse and his sound has often been compared to that of Jason Mraz, David Grey and Josh Rouse.

Early years
Cashen spent his early years writing songs and performing in various groups around Brisbane, this resulted in his first independently released EP 'Lifeboat' in 2003. In 2004 he made the decision to go solo and spent the next three years working on his debut album 'Threads' which was well received by critics and fans. 'Threads' was engineered and produced by noted Australian producer Steve Scanlon, known for his work with artists such as Vanessa Amorosi & Kate Alexa.

A number of singles taken from 'Threads' received support from commercial radio, the album was launched with a tour in July/August 2007 which resulted in capacity shows at venues in Sydney, Melbourne and Brisbane. During 2007 and early 2008, Cashen toured with artists such as the Small Mercies & Charlton Hill. His song 'Naked in the Light' which was the first single to be lifted from the album was featured in an SBS commercial in September 2007.

Commercial Breakthrough
In December 2008, Jeff Cashen's management company issued a press release stating that a licensing deal had just been secured in North America.
A follow up album is due to be released during the first half of 2009.

Discography
Lifeboat- EP 2003
Threads- 2007

References
What's Sung Doc? Drum Media Sydney, 12 June 2007
Casting a Net Inpress Magazine Melbourne, 13 June 2007
Patients on hold for music dreams The Courier Mail Brisbane, 5 July 2007
Stitching up his Passion Mx Sydney, 19 June 2007

Australian singer-songwriters
Living people
Year of birth missing (living people)